Time Squad is an American animated television series created by Dave Wasson for Cartoon Network and the 10th of the network's Cartoon Cartoons. It follows the adventures of Otto Osworth, Buck Tuddrussel, and the robot Larry 3000, a trio of hapless "time cops" living in the far distant future who travel back in time attempting to correct the course of history. During their adventures, they run into major historical figures such as Julius Caesar, Abraham Lincoln, Sigmund Freud, Leonardo da Vinci, the Founding Fathers, and Moctezuma, who have taken a drastically different course of life than history dictates. The mission of the Time Squad is to guide these figures onto the correct path and ensure the integrity of the future.

The series premiered during Cartoon Network's marathon block "Cartoon Cartoon Summer" on June 8, 2001, and ended after two seasons on November 26, 2003, airing 26 episodes in total. In the course of its run, the series received five Annie Award nominations. Creator Dave Wasson described the series as "a C-student's guide to history". It is also the final Cartoon Network original series to premiere during Betty Cohen's tenure, as she later resigned due to creative disagreements with Jamie Kellner, then-head of Turner Broadcasting System. Cohen was eventually replaced with Jim Samples ten days after Time Squad premiered.

The series also marked as the very first Cartoon Network original series to be entirely produced by Cartoon Network Studios, no longer a division of Hanna-Barbera following the death of William Hanna in 2001. The show also began airing on Canada's Teletoon Detour block in 2002. The show features music from Michael Tavera, who would later make music for ¡Mucha Lucha!, Lilo & Stitch: The Series, Yin Yang Yo! and The Secret Saturdays.

Overview
The show is set in the year 100,000,000 AD, on a satellite orbiting Earth. This future Earth is never visited directly, though it is referred to in dialogue as a peaceful utopia where there are no longer any problems to solve. All nations of the world have merged into one, and according to Tuddrussel, there are "no wars, no pollution, and bacon is good for your heart".

Despite this cheerful vision of the future, the space station on which the characters live and from which they travel to the past is remarkably dystopic. It features a shooting range, a terrarium and a prison for repeat offenders, but it is dank, outdated (for the time) and unclean. Mostly this seems to be down to officer Buck Tuddrussel (Rob Paulsen), a scruffy and immature perennial bachelor, who nevertheless happens to be the station's most senior officer.

The only other official member of Buck's unit is Larry 3000 (Mark Hamill), a translator robot and former diplomat who was rendered more or less obsolete when all of the world's nations merged. Buck's mindless machismo clashes with Larry's effete sensibilities, and the two bicker terribly. Added to this the fact that neither of them has any great knowledge of history, they made a rather poor team together.

However, when they encounter Otto Osworth (Pamela Adlon), an 8-year-old boy who happens to be an orphan from the 21st century, he is quickly recruited and added to the team. Otto is shown to be the only one on the team with any enthusiasm or competence for the job. The problem is, neither of the other two are particularly willing to listen to his advice, and he must often resort to trickery to make sure the mission is completed.

The Time Squad organization is set up to ensure that history is maintained and the future protected. According to Larry 3000, "time is like a rope", and, as it is woven at one end, ages and gradually unravels and frays at the other. In the context of the show, this often means that historical figures have made different, sometimes anachronistic, choices in life, and as such will not be able to fulfill the role that history says they fulfilled. According to creator Dave Wasson, "We started by basically knowing what a guy did in history, then found the most outlandish way he could go wrong".

Characters

Main characters
 Otto Osworth (voiced by Pamela Adlon) - An orphan illegally time traveling along with Tuddrussel and Larry, taken on board due to their incompetence and his impressive historical knowledge (and for Otto to escape his brutal life at the orphanage). Despite being a bookworm, his demeanor is far from boring; he is just as childlike and jocular as any regular eight-year-old. Even though he is the youngest of the group, he is also the most responsible out of the squad, being the only one pure enough to not let himself get swayed by temptations. Depending on who he's siding with, he can either become loud and destructive (when Tuddrussel has him company) or composed and calm (when it's Larry he agrees with). It's unknown what happened to Otto's parents.
 Lawrence "Larry" 3000 (voiced by Mark Hamill) - A grumpy robot and the only one on board able to operate the computer. It's his job to make sure the squad ends up at the right time and place. Initially, he was programmed as a polyglottic robot for diplomatic purposes; when all of the nations rejoiced into one, huge country, his consular abilities were no longer needed. Larry is famous for his effeminate behavior and interests, which are portrayed all but subtly. Unusually, he is extremely dramatic and open in showing his emotions whilst still being the snarkiest of the trio. He prides himself on having knowledge of proper etiquette and manners. For Otto, he has been repeatedly depicted as a maternal figure.
 Beauregard "Buck" Tuddrussel (voiced by Rob Paulsen) - An immature time cop, who possesses all the physical requirements for his job and none the intellectual. Whenever there's someone who needs a beating up (and even when they do not), he's the best person to get assigned for such a task. Impulsiveness, aggressiveness, and air-headedness are traits that define Tuddrussel quite nicely. Buck is easygoing toward Otto and prides himself on being the "fun" parent. He often takes Otto to the arcade and lets Otto do whatever he pleases. He generally likes to have talks with Otto and is very open with him. In turn, Otto has an idea of what Buck's love life is like, and what will happen come puberty, being that Buck has had "the talk" with him. While Buck isn't as strict on Otto, he is pretty firm with Otto and sets boundaries. Mainly, Buck thinks kids should have the freedom to do whatever they want.  Not much of his backstory is known, aside from his Southern heritage and a short-lived marriage to fellow time cop Sheila Sternwell.

Recurring
 Sheila Sternwell Tuddrussel (voiced by Mari Weiss) - A lieutenant within Time Squad ranks, Sheila is a no-nonsense woman that takes her job seriously. The ex-wife of Tuddrussel, it is made clear that while she regrets making the mistake of marrying him in the first place, and can be slightly bitter towards him, she actually does not resent him and still does her job and helps out Tuddrussel and his unit when needed. She even seems to go far in not ratting out Tuddrussel and Larry over Otto, and other screw ups that she should be reporting.
 XJ5 (voiced by Daran Norris) - An advanced robot that is more qualified for the job of a time cop than Larry, and he loves to rub it in. Working with Officer Sternwell, XJ5 provides actual help and guidance on missions.

Other characters
 J.T. Laser (voiced by Jim Wise) - Professional and competent, J.T. is the best officer of what Time Squad has to offer; but he is also an arrogant jerk that gladly makes trouble for Tuddrussel and Larry. Despite this, Tuddrussel and Larry are big fans of him and Lance Nine Trillion and still gush over them even after JT and Lance beat them to a pulp.
 Lance Nine Trillion (voiced by Kevin Michael Richardson) - A high-tech robot in Time Squad that provides with the most ranked officer. Lance is the perfect partner for J.T; like XJ5 he boasts about how advanced he is.
 Sister Thornley (voiced by Dee Dee Rescher) - Otto's former caretaker, the nasty nun of the orphanage and the main villain of the show before getting "adopted" by Larry and Tuddrussel. Otto has good reason to fear her, as do the other kids that she keeps. Obviously not afraid of the police or anyone coming after her, Sister Thornley freely abuses kids that are put into her care, while at the orphanage and even more disturbingly in public. Her motives are despairingly questionable, such making the children work under horrific conditions in order to make a quick buck, or why she has a problem with Otto reading books (or any child reading, for that matter. She apparently has an entire policy against it). At the end, Larry and Tuddrussel officially takes Otto much to her dismay, but to her joy she finds another genius child she can abuse.

Voice cast

Main
 Pamela Adlon – Otto Osworth
 Mark Hamill – Larry 3000, Nicolaus Copernicus, Police Commish, Black Bart
 Rob Paulsen – Buck Tuddrussel, Fat Kid, John Adams, French Captain

Additional voices
 Joe Alaskey – Robin Hood, Wilbur Wright, Samuel Morse
 Carlos Alazraqui – Antonio López de Santa Anna, Mahatma Gandhi
 Dee Bradley Baker – Austrian General, Babies
 Jeff Bennett – Townsperson Leader, Jeremiah Tuddrussel, Johannes Gutenberg
 Gregg Berger - Meriwether Lewis, William Clark, Genghis Khan
 Earl Boen – William Howard Taft/Frankenstein
 Rodger Bumpass – Socrates
 Grey DeLisle – Marie Curie, Lizzie Borden, Joan of Arc
 Patti Deutsch – Amelia Earhart
 Marshall Efron – John Montagu / The Earl of Sandwich
 Bernard Fox – Henry Morton Stanley
 Pat Fraley – Kublai Khan, Thomas Paine
 Nika Futterman – Betsy Ross
 Michael J. Gough – David Livingstone, George Washington
 Paul Greenberg – Edgar Allan Poe
 Jennifer Hale – Josephine Bonaparte
 Brian Hamilton – Nostradamus
 Jess Harnell – Attila the Hun
 Bob Joles – Ludwig van Beethoven, Benjamin Franklin, Orville Wright
 John Kassir – Thomas Jefferson, Randall McCoy, Alfred Nobel, Grigori Rasputin
 Tom Kenny – Sigmund Freud, Eli Whitney, Abraham Lincoln, Montezuma
 Joe Lala – Leonardo da Vinci
 Maurice LaMarche – Julius Caesar
  Danny Mann  – Albert Einstein, Harry Houdini
 Vanessa Marshall – Cleopatra
 Jim Meskimen – George W. Bush, George H. W. Bush
 Candi Milo – Dexter
 Daran Norris – XJ5, Samuel Adams, Sinon, Winston Churchill, Franklin D. Roosevelt, Joseph Stalin, Louis Pasteur, Davy Crockett, Master of ceremonies, Philander Knox/Vampire, Jack the Ripper, William Shakespeare
 Patrick Pinney - Thomas Paine
 Jon Polito – Al Capone
 Carlos Ramos – Napoleon Bonaparte
 Dee Dee Rescher – Sister Thornley
 Kevin Michael Richardson – Lance Nine Trillion, Time Squad Officer, George Washington Carver, Todd Washington Carver, George Washington (in "Houdini Whodunit?!"), George S. Patton
 Roger Rose – Edward Teach / Blackbeard, John Hancock
 Glenn Shadix – King of Troy
 James Sie – Confucius
 Kath Soucie – Little Girl, Wife, Old Lady
 Fred Tatasciore - Devil Anse Hatfield
 Jim Ward – Paul Revere
 Dave Wasson - Mrs. O'Leary's Cow
 Mari Weiss – Sheila Sternwell
 Frank Welker – James Sherman/Zombie, Horses, French Captain
 Jim Wise – J.T. Laser

Series overview

Episodes
Note: All episodes were directed by the series creator Dave Wasson, though Larry Leichliter co-directed "Keepin' It Real with Sitting Bull", "A Thrilla at Attila's", "Pasteur's Packs O' Punch", "Love at First Flight", "Child's Play", "Father Figure of Our Country", and "Floral Patton".

Season 1 (2001)

Season 2 (2002–03)

Timeline and world history
 Dinosaur Era
 Stone Age
 1200 BC, Troy
 551 BC, China, Confucius
 399 BC, Ancient Greece, Socrates
 51 BC, Ancient Egypt, Cleopatra
 46 BC, Ancient Rome, Julius Caesar
 438, Far East, Attila
 1156, Sherwood Forest, England, Robin Hood
 1210, Mongol Empire, Kublai Khan
 1323, Medieval England, Edward II of England
 1430, France, Joan of Arc
 1450, Germany, Johannes Gutenberg
 1500, Florence, Italy, Leonardo da Vinci
 1502, Tenochtitlan, Montezuma
 1520, Poland, Nicolaus Copernicus
 1537, Atlantic Ocean, Hernando de Soto
 1547, Moscow, Russia, Ivan the Terrible
 1605, Stratford-upon-Avon, England, William Shakespeare
 1717, Atlantic Ocean, Blackbeard
 1719, Caribbean, Blackbeard
 1762, London, Great Britain, Earl of Sandwich
 1773, Boston, Massachusetts, Samuel Adams
 1775, Boston, Massachusetts, Paul Revere
 1776, Philadelphia, Pennsylvania, Betsy Ross and Benjamin Franklin
 1778, Philadelphia, Pennsylvania, George Washington
 1783, Savannah, Georgia, Eli Whitney
 1797, Paris, France, Napoleon
 1803, Vienna, Austria, Ludwig van Beethoven
 1804, Louisiana Purchase, Lewis and Clark
 1836, San Antonio, Texas, Davy Crockett
 1836, Washington, D.C., Samuel Morse
 1845, Baltimore, Maryland, Edgar Allan Poe
 1863, Washington, D.C., Abraham Lincoln
 1864, Stockholm, Sweden, Alfred Nobel
 1866, Kansas City, Kansas, Buffalo Bill
 1871, Africa, Henry Morton Stanley
 1876, Great Plains, Sitting Bull
 1876, West Virginia, The Hatfields and McCoys
 1877, The Old West, Billy the Kid
 1888, Paris, France, Louis Pasteur
 1895, New York City, Harry Houdini
 1899, Vienna, Austria, Sigmund Freud
 1903, Dayton, Ohio, Wright brothers
 1911, Washington, D.C., William Howard Taft
 1915, Tuskegee, Alabama, George Washington Carver
 1925, Chicago, Illinois, Al Capone
 1930, Los Angeles, California, Amelia Earhart
 1941, Great Britain, Winston Churchill
 1942, Washington, D.C., George S. Patton
 1945, Texas, Albert Einstein
 2001, Present day
 2002, Washington, D.C., George W. Bush
 3000, Fly City
 100,000,000, Far Future

Reception

Awards and nominations

Promotions
Cartoon Network and Subway partnered to release five Time Squad-themed toys in Subway Kids Paks. The promotion lasted from September 30 to November 17, 2002.

References

External links

  (archive)
 
 

Cartoon Network original programming
Television series by Cartoon Network Studios
Depictions of Julius Caesar on television
2000s American animated television series
2000s American comic science fiction television series
2001 American television series debuts
2003 American television series endings
2000s American time travel television series
English-language television shows
Animated television series about orphans
Animated television series about robots
Animation based on real people
Television series set in the future
Television series created by Dave Wasson
American children's animated comic science fiction television series
American children's animated science fantasy television series
Cultural depictions of Abraham Lincoln
Cultural depictions of Sigmund Freud
Cultural depictions of Leonardo da Vinci
Cartoon Cartoons